Mahaut River may refer to:

 Mahaut River (St. Paul), a river in Dominica that reaches the Caribbean Sea close to the town of Massacre
 Mahaut River (St. David), Dominica
 Mahaut River (Saint Lucia) - see List of rivers in Saint Lucia

See also 
 Mahaut (disambiguation)